Ince is an English toponymic surname, from Ince in Cheshire or one of two places historically in Lancashire (now known as Ince Blundell and Ince-in-Makerfield). İnce is a Turkish surname.  The name may refer to:

 Ada Ince (1913–1975), American film actress
 Basil Ince (born 1933), Trinidadian sprinter
 Clayton Ince, Trinidadian football player
 Edward Lindsay Ince (1891–1941), English mathematician
 Sir Godfrey Ince, British civil servant
 Harry Ince (1893–1978), Barbadian cricketer
 Henry Ince (1736–1808), British Army officer
 Henry Bret Ince (1830–1889), British businessman, writer and politician
 İzzet İnce (born 1981), Turkish weightlifter
 James Ince (born c. 1969), American NASCAR crew chief
 John F. Ince, American author and business journalist
 John Ince (Australian politician) (1831–1897)
 John Ince (activist), Canadian politician
 John Ince (actor) (1878–1947)
 John Ince (footballer) (1908 – after 1934), English footballer
 John Ince (missionary), early British Protestant missionary
 Joseph Murray Ince (1806–1859), Welsh painter
 Kaan İnce (1970–1992), Turkish writer and poet
 Kamran Ince, Turkish-American composer
 Muharrem İnce, Turkish politician (born 1964)
 Paul Ince, English football player
 Robin Ince, English comedian
 Ralph Ince (1887–1937), American film actor and director
 Rohan Ince, English football player
 Sabit İnce (born 1934), Turkish poet
 Steve Ince, award-winning British video games designer
 Tom Ince, English football player, son of Paul Ince
 Thomas H. Ince, American silent film actor and director
 Tony Ince, Canadian politician
 William Ince (cabinet maker), British cabinetmaker
 William Ince (theologian), British theologian
 William Ince (MP), MP for Chester, 1660–1661

See also
 Ince (disambiguation)

References 

English toponymic surnames
Turkish-language surnames